James Edward Staples (born 20 October 1965 in Bermondsey) is a former rugby union footballer. He played as a fullback.

He had 26 caps for Ireland, scoring 5 tries and 2 conversions, 25 points in aggregate. He played club rugby for London Irish and Harlequins. Staples alongside club colleague Simon Geoghegan also represented Connacht in the Irish Provincial Championship, which at the time served as trial games for selection to the national team.

Staples played at the 1991 Rugby World Cup and at the 1995 Rugby World Cup. He played 5 times at the Five Nations, in 1991, 1992, 1995, 1996 and 1997.

During his playing career Staples weighed 82 kg and was 1.88m in height.

External links
Jim Staples International Statistics

1965 births
Living people
Connacht Rugby players
English rugby union players
Harlequin F.C. players
Ireland international rugby union players
Irish Exiles rugby union players
London Irish players
Rugby union players from the London Borough of Southwark
Rugby union fullbacks